Deborah Drattell (born 1954) is an American composer.  She was born in Brooklyn, New York, and started her career in music as a violinist. Her compositions have been performed by the New York Philharmonic, Orchestra of St. Luke's, the Tanglewood and Caramoor Music Festivals, and many other groups and venues. She rewrote the role of the villain in Nicholas and Alexandra, Rasputin, from baritone to tenor when Plácido Domingo expressed interest in singing the role.

Selected operas

Festival of Regrets (1999)
Marina Tsvetaeva (2000)
Lilith (2001)
Nicholas and Alexandra (2003, Los Angeles Opera), with Plácido Domingo as Rasputin, Nancy Gustafson as Alexandra, and Rod Gilfry as Nicholas.
Best Friends (2005) libretto by Wendy Wasserstein and Christopher Durang

Selected orchestral works
Clarinet Concerto: Fire Dances (1986)
The Fire Within (1989)
Sorrow is not Melancholy (1993)

References

1956 births
Living people
Tulane University faculty
20th-century classical composers
American women classical composers
American classical composers
American opera composers
Musicians from Brooklyn
Women opera composers
21st-century classical composers
21st-century American composers
20th-century American women musicians
20th-century American composers
21st-century American women musicians
Classical musicians from New York (state)
20th-century women composers
21st-century women composers
American women academics